The Revolutionary Committee of Puerto Rico was founded by Puerto Rican exiles such as Juan Ríus Rivera, Ramón Emeterio Betances and José Francisco Basora  living at the time in Santo Domingo, Dominican Republic. The committee was founded on January 8, 1867, and composed of Puerto Rican and Dominican patriots. The goal of the committee was to create a united effort by Cubans and Puerto Ricans to win independence from Spain. Early in the Cuban Ten Years' War, the Revolutionary Committee gave financial support, and weaponry to the Cuban independence efforts. Such weaponry included 400 Enfield rifles, 45 snider rifles, 110 carbines, 87 handguns and one cannon with 200 shells, culminated from hidden caches on Saint Thomas, Curaçao and Haiti.

El Grito de Lares

On September 23, 1868, the Revolutionary Committee, led by Betances, declared independence in the city of Lares, Puerto Rico, calling it the Republic of Puerto Rico. Some 400–600 rebels gathered in the vicinity of Pezuela, on the outskirts of Lares. The rebels walked and rode to the town, arriving by midnight. The forces took over city hall, and looted stores and officies owned by "peninsulares" (Spanish-born men), taking some of the store owners prisoner. By 2:00 AM, the Republic of Puerto Rico was proclaimed under the presidency of Francisco Ramírez Medina. The revolution was put down however by the Spanish militia and some 475 rebels imprisoned. The event became known as The Cry of Lares.

New York City

On December 8, 1895, the Puerto Rican Revolutionary Committee was established in New York City, where many exiles had gathered. This group promoted the ideal of Puerto Rican independence from Spain. It included as members, such participants of El Grito de Lares as Ramon Emiterio Betances, Juan Ríus Rivera, Juan de Mata Terreforte and Aurelio Méndez Martinez. The Committee named Terreforte  as its vice-president. In 1892, Terreforte and the members of the Revolutionary committee adopted the design of a flag similar to the Cuban flag, but with its colors inverted. This new flag, to represent the Republic of Puerto Rico, is still used on the island.

Intentona de Yauco

In 1897, Antonio Mattei Lluberas visited the Puerto Rican Revolutionary Committee in New York City. There he met with Emiterio Betances, de Mata Terreforte and Méndez Martinez; together they planned a major coup. Betances was to direct it, Mendez Mercado would organize it, and General Rius Rivera would command the armed forces. At the time Ríus Rivera, who had joined the Cuban Liberation Army and José Martí's struggle for Cuban independence, was the Commander-in-Chief of the Cuban Liberation Army of the West.

Mattei Lluberas purchased 30,000 machetes, which were to be distributed amongst the rebels. He returned to Puerto Rico with a Puerto Rican flag and began to proceed with the rebellion plans.

The Spanish authorities found out about their plans. Mattei Lluberas demanded that the insurrection start immediately rather than in December. The other leaders feared that such a haste action would lead to the same disastrous results as had El Grito de Lares.

Mattei Lluberas and the Puerto Rican Commission in New York had been trying to convince President William McKinley to invade Puerto Rico for some time. After the US took control of Cuba, McKinley approved the invasion of Puerto Rico. A convoy of ships left Tampa, Florida and on July 21 another convoy departed from Guantánamo for a 4-day journey to Puerto Rico.

Under the terms of the Treaty of Paris of 1898, ratified on December 10, 1898, the United States annexed Puerto Rico.

See also

El Grito de Lares
Intentona de Yauco
Puerto Rican independence movement
Ramón Emeterio Betances
List of Puerto Ricans
List of Puerto Rican military personnel

References

1867 establishments in the Spanish Empire
Independence movements
Political history of Puerto Rico
Ten Years' War
Organizations established in 1867
Paramilitary organizations based in Puerto Rico